William Lewis "Chuck" Wortman (January 5, 1892 – August 19, 1977) was a professional baseball player. He played all or part of three seasons in Major League Baseball from 1916 to 1918 for the Chicago Cubs, primarily as a shortstop.

External links

Major League Baseball shortstops
Chicago Cubs players
Savannah Indians players
Savannah Colts players
Kansas City Blues (baseball) players
Louisville Colonels (minor league) players
Baseball players from Baltimore
1892 births
1977 deaths